Spin Master is a Canadian multinational toy and entertainment company that markets consumer products for children. Its brands include Bakugan, Gund, Etch A Sketch,  Meccano/ Erector, Air Hogs, PAW Patrol, Aquadoodle, Tech Deck, Hatchimals, Rubik's Cube, and Zoomer. Spin Master employs over 1,600 people globally with offices in Australia, Canada, China, France, Germany, Hong Kong, India, Italy, Japan, Mexico, the Netherlands, Poland, Slovakia, Sweden, the United Kingdom, the United States, and Vietnam.

Since 2002, Spin Master has received 92 "Toy of The Year" (TOTY) nominations with 28 wins across a variety of product categories, including 13 TOTY nominations for "Innovative Toy of the Year", more than any other toy company.  In 2022, Spin Master won The Golden Screen Award for Feature Film, presented by the Academy of Canadian Cinema & Television, for PAW Patrol: The Movie. The Golden Screen Award recognizes the Canadian film that grossed the highest domestic box office over the time period of Jan 1, 2021 to Feb 24, 2022. As of 2021, Chase the police pup and Marshall the firefighting pup, two characters from PAW Patrol, are the company's mascots.

History 
Three college friends from the Ivey Business School at the University of Western Ontario - Ronnen Harary, Anton Rabie and Ben Varadi - founded Spin Master with $10,000 in Toronto in 1994. The company's first product, Earth Buddies, were small heads made out of Kmart pantyhose and grass seeds, which grew "hair" when watered. The Earth Buddy went on to sell over 26,000 units.

Spin Master's first major success came in 1998 with the launch of the Air Hogs brand and its first item, the Sky Shark. Developed from the prototype provided by inventors John Dixon and Peter Manning, the Sky Shark was a foam plane that used compressed air to enable outdoor flight. Product development took over two years and more than $500,000, but ended up generating $103 million in revenue over the next few years. The Sky Shark put Spin Master on the map, becoming one of the most popular toys in the world and earning them a slot on daytime television Regis and Kathie Lee alongside other international press.

The company, which had grown to 28 employees by 1999, told the LA Times they were already “assessing 1,000 inventions a year.” They’d moved their manufacturing supply chain to Hong Kong in 1998 and were ready to rise as a new name in the toy industry.

The company scored another success in 1999, with Flix Trix Finger Bikes, a string of 1/2 inch replicas of BMX bikes. In 2003, the company made its first corporate acquisition buying Bounce ‘Round, a company that created scaled down versions of the inflatable bouncy castles. Over the next handful of years, Spin Master opened offices in the United States, Japan and Western Europe.

In 2008, Spin Master launched the Bakugan Battle Brawlers franchise, a card game developed in conjunction with Sega Toys, featured plastic balls which burst open to reveal anime-style characters. Bakugan reached almost $1 billion in yearly sales.

Under Harary's leadership, Spin Master Entertainment launched with Bakugan Battle Brawlers the animated action adventure television series under the direction of Mitsuo Hashimoto. To date, Spin Master Entertainment has developed six television series with over 400 cumulative episodes. In 2019, Abby Hatcher, an animated preschool series debuted on Nickelodeon on January 1, 2019, in the U.S. The show centers on Abby and her new friends the Fuzzlies, who are amazing and quirky creatures that live in her family's hotel. Together with her best Fuzzly friend Bozzly, Abby goes on wild adventures to fix Fuzzly mishaps and help them in any way she can. In 2020, Spin Master launched its first direct to Netflix series, Mighty Express. The show follows a team of trains and their kid best-buddies as they keep things moving and get the delivery through no matter what the trouble -one thrilling adventure after another.

In August 2013, Spin Master acquired the Erector Set by Meccano construction set line. In June 2015, Spin Master entered into an agreement to acquire Cardinal Industries, a 60-year-old game and puzzles company. The purchase made Spin Master the second largest games company in the United States. A month after announcing it was buying Cardinal, Spin Master made its initial public offering on the Toronto Stock Exchange.

In January 2016 Spin Master purchased the library of board games owned by Editrice Giochi SRL, one of the oldest privately held toy game companies in Italy. In February 2016, Spin Master bought the Etch A Sketch and Doodle Sketch brands from The Ohio Art Company for an undisclosed price. In April 2016, Spin Master purchased digital toy makers Toca Boca and Sago Mini from the Bonnier Group of Sweden. In August 2016 Spin Master diversified into the water and outdoor sports category through the acquisition of Swimways corporation.

In 2017, Spin Master acquired Marbles, a firm known for creating games, gifts and gadgets and the maker of Otrio; Aerobie, a leading producer of outdoor flying disks and sports toys; and Perplexus, a 3D ball-in-a-maze Spin Master had been distributing since 2013.

In March 2018, Spin Master acquired the 120 year old stuffed toy brand Gund. Spin Master is now a $1.5 billion (sales) company, which employs over 1,600 people in 16 countries.  At the end of 2019, Spin Master completed the acquisition of the award-winning Orbeez brand from Maya Toys, complementing its growing Activities segment. Also in 2019 Spin Master started a ten year toy licensing contract with Monster Jam ending a previous toy licensing deal between Monster Jam and Mattel who marketed it Monster Jam toys under the Hot Wheels line.

In February 2020, Spin Master announced the theatrical release of the PAW Patrol movie, a Spin Master Entertainment production in association with Nickelodeon Movies and distributed by Paramount Pictures. PAW Patrol: The Movie released in theatres on August 20, 2021, grossing $142 million worldwide. Following the success of its first theatrical film for the franchise, Spin Master announced that production had begun on a sequel, PAW Patrol: The Mighty Movie slated to release on September 29, 2023. On 27 October 2020, Spin Master said it will pay $50 million for Rubik's Cube, the iconic game invented nearly 50 years ago. The acquisition was completed on 5 January 2021. At the end of 2020, Spin Master announced executive leadership changes appointing Max Rangel as Global President effective January 2021, assuming the position of Global President and CEO in April 2021.

In 2021, Spin Master launched the Future of Play Scholarship committing to invest $100,000 in financial aid annually to the education and mentorship of underrepresented individuals. On October 19, 2021, Spin Master established Spin Master Ventures, a $100 million venture fund to back up games, toys and entertainment startups with investments made in Nordlight, a game development company in Stockholm and Hoot Reading, an online tutoring service that provides reading lessons to children. By the end of 2021, Spin Master had grown to a global children's entertainment company, employing over 2,000 people in 28 offices around the world.

Spin Master toys 
 Abby Hatcher (2019–present)
 Air Hogs
 Angry Birds 
 Bakugan Battle Brawlers
 Bella Dancerella (2005-2007)
 Bunchems
 Cars 2
 Etch A Sketch (2016–present)
 Hatchimals
 How to Train Your Dragon (film)
 Kinetic Sand
 Little Charmers (2015-2017)
 Masha and the Bear
 Minecraft
 Monster Jam (2019-present, (current contract expires in 2029))
 Monsters University
 NASCAR
 Orbeez
 PAW Patrol (2013–present)
 Peppa Pig (2010-2013, moved to Fisher Price until they moved to Hasbro)
 PJ Masks (2015-2018, moved to Hasbro)
 Pirates of the Caribbean
 Rusty Rivets (2016–2018)
 Sick Bricks
 Star Wars
 Teenage Mutant Ninja Turtles
 The Powerpuff Girls
 The Wiggles (2003-2006)
 Tron: Legacy
 Twisty Petz  
 Yo Gabba Gabba (2007-2012)
 ZhuZhu Pets

Spin Master Games 

Spin Master Games is the board game division of the company. Spin Master also owns Cardinal Industries, Marbles  and Editrice Giochi board and card game publishers. Spin Master Games publishes titles such as:

 Boom Boom Balloon – Winner of 2014 "Game of the Year" from the Toy Industry Association  Push sticks from an outside frame into a balloon until it pops. The loser is determined by who pops the balloon.
 Quick Cups – A fast-paced pattern game. A card is flipped over; the player's job is to match the colored pattern with 5 colored cups as quickly as possible.
 Hedbanz – An interactive game where players try to guess the card on their head by asking yes–no questions. Variations include Act Up with charades-style play, Disney Hedbanz with licensed Disney characters included, and Hedbanz for Adults - a more difficult version of Hedbanz.
 PAW Patrol Adventure Game – A preschool game based on licensed Paw Patrol characters.
 Perplexus – A one player 3D labyrinth inside a clear sphere.
 Beat the Parents – A kids v. parents trivia game in which teams answer questions about the opposite generation. Available in board game and card game versions.
 Quelf – A completely random game where players pick cards and follow them to move ahead. The cards range from answering crazy questions to performing ridiculous stunts.
 Battle of the Sexes – A male vs. female trivia game in which teams answer gender-defining questions about the opposite sex.
 Heads Up! – A party game where players try to guess as many words on their heads as they can before a minute runs out. Other players assist by shouting clues to help the player score as many cards as possible.
 Soggy Doggy - Winner of 2018 “Game of the Year” from the Toy Industry Association. Players move around the board and take turns bathing the pup. The first player to make it around the board without getting wet wins.
 Upwords - A high-stacking word game where players place tile letters onto the game board to create new words.
 Bellz! - A strategy game where players must pick up their corresponding bell colors using a magnetic wand.
 H5 Domino Creations - Designed in collaboration with domino artist Lily Hevesh. The set includes 100 dominoes.
 Santorini - A strategic family board game where players build, block and climb their way to the top of a building. There is also a spin-off game called Santorini: New York.
 Disney Sidekicks - A cooperative strategy game where players work together as Disney themed sidekicks to defeat the Disney villains and save the heroes.
 Tell Me Without Telling Me - A party game for adults where teams must beat each other to be the fastest to guess the words on the cards.

Spin Master Entertainment
Alongside the company's toy and board game businesses, they are the company behind several successful kids' media franchises:

Television 
 Bakugan Battle Brawlers - February 24, 2008 – January 26, 2012 on TV Tokyo (Japan), Network 10 (Australia), Teletoon (Canada), Cartoon Network (Australasia, India, Indonesia (also on Indosiar), Malaysia (also on TV9 and TV3), Philippines (also on GMA Network), Pakistan, Southeast Asia, Singapore (also on Okto), United Kingdom (also on Kix now known as Pop Max) and United States). 
 Redakai: Conquer the Kairu - July 9, 2011 – December 23, 2013 on YTV (Canada), Cartoon Network (U.S.), Canal J & Gulli (France)
 PAW Patrol - August 12, 2013–present on TVOKids (Canada); Nickelodeon (U.S, Latin America), Nick Jr. (U.S. & Latin America) Clan (Spain)
 Tenkai Knights - August 24, 2013 – December 6, 2014 on Cartoon Network (U.S.); Teletoon (Canada); TV Tokyo (Japan)
 Little Charmers - January 12, 2015 – April 15, 2017 on Treehouse TV (Canada), Nickelodeon (U.S.), 
 Rusty Rivets - November 8, 2016 – May 8, 2020 on Treehouse TV; Nickelodeon (U.S.) 2016–2018, Nick Jr. (U.S.) 2018–2020
 Super Dinosaur - September 8, 2018 - January 26, 2019 on Teletoon (Canada), Amazon Prime Video
 Bakugan: Battle Planet - December 23, 2018 – March 1, 2023 on TV Tokyo (Japan), 9Go! (Australia), Teletoon & YTV (Canada), Cartoon Network (Australasia, India, Indonesia (also on RTV), Malaysia (also on TV9 and TV3), Philippines (also on GMA Network), Pakistan, Southeast Asia, Singapore (also on Okto), United Kingdom (also on Pop Max) and United States). 
 Abby Hatcher - January 1, 2019 – April 2, 2022 on TVOKids (Canada); Nickelodeon (U.S.)
 Zo Zo Zombie - March 19, 2020 on YouTube; February 1, 2021–present on Toon-A-Vision (Canada)
 Mighty Express - September 22, 2020 – present on Netflix
 Sago Mini Friends - September 16, 2022 – present on AppleTV+
 Rubble & Crew - February 3, 2023 – present on Treehouse TV (Canada); Nickelodeon (U.S.)

Upcoming
 Vida The Vet - 2023 on CBeebies, PBS Kids and Treehouse TV
 Unicorn Academy - 2023 on Netflix
 Bella's Bro-Bots - 2024 on Treehouse TV

Movies 
 PAW Patrol: The Movie - August 20, 2021 - co-production with Paramount Pictures, Nickelodeon Movies and Elevation Pictures (Canadian distribution)

Upcoming
 PAW Patrol: The Mighty Movie - September 29, 2023 - co-production with Paramount Pictures, Nickelodeon Movies and Elevation Pictures (Canadian distribution)

Spin Master Digital Games 

In 2012, Spin Master launched its first digital gaming app for Tech Deck. Other successful apps connected to the company's entertainment and toy Intellectual properties followed and, in 2016, Spin Master expanded its offering in the digital space with the acquisition of global mobile and digital app brands Toca Boca and Sago Mini. Spin Master Digital Games' most popular titles include:

 Toca Life: World - The iPhone App of the Year in 2021; a free virtual world app that combines the apps from the "Toca Life" series into one and allows children to "enjoy open-ended imaginative digital play."
 Sago Mini World - A subscription app containing over 35 games designed for users aged 2–6 years, including features based on building and creating with imagination and curiosity.
 Sago Mini School - A preschool-targeted app that attempts to help young children build maths, literacy, science and spacial skills through learning games.

References 

Companies listed on the Toronto Stock Exchange
Entertainment companies established in 1994
Manufacturing companies based in Toronto
Canadian companies established in 1994
Entertainment companies of Canada
Toy companies established in 1994
1994 establishments in Ontario
2015 initial public offerings
Toy companies of Canada